Misha Crosby (born 28 January 1987) is a British director, actor and producer.

Crosby was born and brought up in London. He won The Helmore Music Scholarship to Mill Hill School and lead a world premier on the violin at the Wigmore Hall at 14 years old. He performed for the National Youth Music Theatre.

He previously starred in the BBC television series Holby City as Sam Strachan's son Kieron, in Channel 4's Hollyoaks and has had various guest appearances in other TV shows. From 2011-2012 he played Ryan Harwell in the ABC Family/Warner Brothers television series The Lying Game.

Film roles include, Abbas in the award-winning British feature film Life Goes On, and he stars in Beyond Paradise playing the pivotal role of the traumatized loner Ray alongside Ryan Guzman, Francia Raisa and Daphne Zuniga.

The film "6 Years, 4 Months & 23 Days" in which Crosby plays Rick, won the Copper Wing: Best Live Action Short Film, at the Phoenix Film Festival 2013.

In 2015 he was offered a series regular role in BitTorrent’s first Original TV series ‘Children of The Machine’, by Marco Webber Brooklyn’s Finest, Igby Goes Down. The series is set to be produced by Rapid Eye Studios and is the first show to be distributed directly through BitTorrent to an audience of 170 million viewers.

He was cast in season 9 of American Horror Story AHS 1984 as the leader of Kajagoogoo, Limahl and has is throat slit in episode 7 The Lady in White by Robert Ramirez. He subsequently returns as a ghost from Episode 8, Rest In Pieces.

Lionsgate acquired Cannabis thriller Green Rush, starring Misha Crosby, Paul Telfer, Mike Foy, Kriss Dozal and Andre Fili for an April 2020 release. The movie was produced by Misha Crosby, Urijah Faber, Rick Lee and Gerard Roxburgh.

In 2020 Crosby was named as the series Showrunner & Director of Unsinkable starring John Malkovich, Brian Cox, Thomas Brodie-Sangster, Nathalie Emmanuel and Harry Hamlin

Filmography

Awards and nominations

References

External links

1987 births
Living people
People educated at Mill Hill School
English expatriates in the United States
English male film actors
Alumni of the Drama Studio London
21st-century English male actors
English male soap opera actors
Male actors from London